The Gum Wall is a brick wall covered in used chewing gum under Pike Place Market in Downtown Seattle, Washington, United States. It is located on Post Alley near Pike Street, south of the market's main entrance off 1st Avenue. The Market Theater Gum Wall has become a tourist attraction and local landmark since it was unintentionally created in the 1990s.

History

The wall is located in Post Alley adjacent to the box office for the Market Theater, a venue for comedy shows and other small performances. After it became the host of Unexpected Productions' Theatresports in 1991, the theater's walls were covered by patrons' pieces of used gum that had pennies pushed into them. The coins were later removed, but the gum remained amid several cleanings of the walls under orders from the Pike Place Market Preservation and Development Authority. The market's officials reversed course and allowed the gum wall to stay, deeming it to be a tourist attraction around 1999.

Some contributors to the gum wall arranged their pieces to create small works of art.

Since 1999, it has become one of the most recognizable tourist destinations in the Pike Place Market area and receives thousands of visitors annually. Visitors regularly add new gum to the wall. In 2015, the Pike Place Market Preservation and Development Authority removed all the gum from the wall and steam-cleaned it in order to prevent the degradation of the brick.  of gum were removed. Visitors and local residents soon added a new layer of gum to the wall immediately after the cleanup was completed, and gum has continued to accumulate.

Recognition
It was named one of the top 5 germiest tourist attractions in 2009, second to the Blarney Stone. The Washington state governor, Jay Inslee, said it is his "favorite thing about Seattle you can't find anywhere else". The Gum Wall is located at the start of the Ghost Tour, and also a popular site with wedding photographers. Oftentimes, visitors create declarations of love out of gum, making for a comparison of the gum wall to other romantic spots such as the Pont des Art in Paris.

Cleaning

On November 3, 2015, it was announced by the Pike Place Market Preservation & Development Authority that for the first time in 20 years the great attraction gum wall would be receiving a total scrub down for maintenance and steam cleaning, to prevent further erosion of the bricks on the walls from the sugar in the gum. Prior to this, it had only ever been spot-cleaned in areas where gum had been placed in prohibited areas.

Because the announcement of the cleaning caused a lot of commotion amongst Seattle residents and fans of the tourist spot, Pike Place Market officials launched a photo contest in which fans were encouraged to share their own photos and memories with the wall online.

The work, done by local company Cascadian Building Maintenance, was figured to cost about $4,000 for completion. The gum was then disposed of in the garbage.

After the cleaning was finished, gum began to be re-added to the wall almost immediately, as there were no preventative measures to prohibit sticking gum to the newly cleaned wall. Some of the new additions were memorials to the November 2015 Paris attacks.

Controversy 
Some argue that the gum wall encourages litter as visitors usually stick items like cigarette butts or gum wrappers along the wall. There were also prior complaints that the gum was being tracked into nearby businesses and that it attracts rats in the alley. Bars and restaurants located on the opposite side of the attraction tried to keep the gum away from their properties by posting signs that read 'No Gum'. However, this tactic was not successful.

As art
The gum wall is an example of participatory art and conceptual art.

Although officials of the Pike Place Market defined the concern around gum affecting the brick wall, some may see the participation in sticking up the substance as attributing to collective action. Many may classify the spot as a 'collective art' piece, where something colloquially bad has been transformed into artwork.

The wall is also usually decorated with physical copies of some artists' work that they stick up. Given that the wall is rarely cleaned, many practice graffiti art on spots where there is less gum and more visibility.

See also
 Bubblegum Alley

References

External links
 

Chewing gum
Pike Place Market
Tourist attractions in Seattle
Central Waterfront, Seattle